Koryne Kaneski Horbal (February 11, 1937 - May 15, 2017) was a United States Representative on the Commission on the Status of Women of the Economic and Social Council of the United Nations. She also served as a chairwoman of the Minnesota Democratic Farmer Labor Party.

In 1973, she and five other women founded the DFL Feminist Caucus, with Horbal as Chair. It was the first instance of U.S. party regulars organizing as an independent political force outside their own party to support feminist principles, including the Equal Rights Amendment, reproductive rights, workplace equity, and, most controversially, a pledge to support only DFL candidates who would endorse the caucus principles. The other founders were Cynthia Kitlinski, Yvette Oldendorf, Mary Pattock (then Bremer), Jeri Rasmussen, and Peggy Specktor. Within a year, their grass-roots organizing resulted in increasing the number of women in the Minnesota State Legislature from one to 14 — all of them feminist. Their first legislative success, won in coalition with other women's groups, was ratification of the Equal Rights Amendment. (State Republican feminists soon followed suit with a GOP Feminist Caucus.)

The caucus subsequently gave up its independent status, and became chartered by the DFL party.

In 1980, although she was not a candidate, Horbal won five votes for President of the United States at the Democratic National Convention, which placed her after Jimmy Carter, Ted Kennedy, and William Proxmire (see below).

In 2004, Augsburg College established the Koryne Horbal Lecture series in her honor. The series has featured Robin Morgan (2004), Jane Fonda (2007), Winona LaDuke (2008), Alicia Cabezudo (2009), and The Guerrilla Girls (2010), among others.

In 2008, Augsburg awarded Horbal an Honorary Doctorate in Humane Letters, in recognition of her work around the world, "which has given voice to women's political and social issues".

She died on 15 May 2017, at the age of 80.

1980 Democratic National Convention
 Jimmy Carter (inc.) – 2,123 (64.04%)
 Ted Kennedy – 1,151 (34.72%)
 William Proxmire – 10 (0.30%)
 Koryne Kaneski Horbal – 5 (0.15%)
 Scott M. Matheson, Sr. – 5 (0.15%)
 Ron Dellums – 3 (0.09%)
 Robert Byrd – 2 (0.06%)
 John Culver – 2 (0.06%)
 Kent Hance – 2 (0.06%)
 Jennings Randolph – 2 (0.06%)
 Warren Spannaus – 2 (0.06%)
 Alice Tripp – 2 (0.06%)
 Jerry Brown – 1 (0.03%)
 Dale Bumpers – 1 (0.03%)
 Hugh L. Carey – 1 (0.03%)
 Walter Mondale – 1 (0.03%)
 Edmund Muskie – 1 (0.03%)
 Thomas J. Steed – 1 (0.03%)

References

External links
 DFL Feminist Caucus
 The DFL Feminist Caucus's records are available at the Minnesota Historical Society.

2017 deaths
Minnesota Democrats
Candidates in the 1980 United States presidential election
20th-century American politicians
Women in Minnesota politics
American feminists
Year of birth missing
20th-century American women politicians
21st-century American women